Singkawang International Airport (Indonesian: Bandara Udara Internasional Singkawang), (IATA: none, ICAO: none) is an under-construction international airport, which will serve the city of Singkawang in West Kalimantan, Indonesia. It will also become an alternative to the existing Supadio International Airport at Pontianak.

History
Due to increasing traffic and capacity constraints at Supadio International Airport in Pontianak, the airport will not be able to cope with the future traffic, due to lack of space for expansion. The airport will help to boost tourism, revenue, employment and foster socio-economic development of the region. It is expected to generate 15.9 trillion rupiah (US$1.12 billion) in aeronautical revenue and 2.1 trillion rupiah in non-aeronautical revenue over a period of 32 years. So, in 2018, the mayor of Singkawang, Tjhai Chui Mie, submitted a proposal for a new airport to serve the city to Indonesia's Ministry of Transport. The  ministry approved the decision, and the process of land acquisition began. It completed at the end of 2018, and construction began from late 2020, and was expected to completed by 2023, but it is now expected to be completed by the end of 2024.

Features

The airport will be built in two phases, at an area of 151 hectares and at a cost of 4.3 trillion rupiah, out of which the first phase will be completed by 2024. The airport will consist of a passenger terminal building with two aerobridges, an Air Traffic Control (ATC) tower, and a 1,400 m long runway along with a taxiway connecting it among other ancillary facilities. The runway will be capable of handling ATR type aircraft.

In the second phase, the airport's terminal will be expanded to handle more traffic, and the runway will be extended to 2,600 m to handle Airbus A320 and Boeing 737 aircraft.

Construction
In January 2018, The Mayor of Singkawang, Tjhai Chui Mie, stated the city's administration is reviewing plans for land clearance in Semelagi Kecil village for the construction of a privately funded airport. In November 2018, the city administration has acquired 106 hectares of land for the construction of the airport.

The ground breaking ceremony for the airport is held on February 2019 by Indonesia's Minister of Transport, Budi Karya Sumadi. Construction will begin from 2020 and will be completed by 2023. Sumadi also invited the private sector to invest in the airport project in West Kalimantan via Public–Private partnerships (PPP). The Ministry of Transport will sign the PPP contract in 2023.

In June 2022, it is announced that the completion of the airport will be delayed to the end of 2024.

See also
 Supadio International Airport
 List of airports in Indonesia

References

Airports in West Kalimantan